is a passenger railway station in the city of Tsukubamirai, Ibaraki Prefecture, Japan operated by the private railway company Kantō Railway.

Lines

Station layout
The station consists of two opposed side platforms connected by a level crossing. The station is unattended.

Platforms

Adjacent stations

History
Kokinu Station was opened on 1 November 1913 as a station on the Jōsō Railroad, which became the Kantō Railway in 1965. The station building was rebuilt in 1963 and again in 1990.

Passenger statistics
In fiscal 2016, the station was used by an average of 942 passengers daily (boarding passengers only).

Surrounding area
 Kokinu Post Office
Kokinu Hachiman-gu
 
Ibaraki New Town Kinu-no-dai

See also
 List of railway stations in Japan

References

External links

  Kantō Railway Station Information 

Railway stations in Ibaraki Prefecture
Railway stations in Japan opened in 1913
Tsukubamirai, Ibaraki